Motivational salience is a cognitive process and a form of attention that motivates or propels an individual's behavior towards or away from a particular object, perceived event or outcome. Motivational salience regulates the intensity of behaviors that facilitate the attainment of a particular goal, the amount of time and energy that an individual is willing to expend to attain a particular goal, and the amount of risk that an individual is willing to accept while working to attain a particular goal.

Motivational salience is composed of two component processes that are defined by their attractive or aversive effects on an individual's behavior relative to a particular stimulus: incentive salience and aversive salience. Incentive salience is the attractive form of motivational salience that causes approach behavior, and is associated with operant reinforcement, desirable outcomes, and pleasurable stimuli. Aversive salience is the aversive form of motivational salience that causes avoidance behavior, and is associated with operant punishment, undesirable outcomes, and unpleasant stimuli.

Incentive salience

Incentive salience is a cognitive process that grants a "desire" or "want" attribute, which includes a motivational component to a rewarding stimulus. Reward is the attractive and motivational property of a stimulus that induces appetitive behavior – also known as approach behavior – and consummatory behavior. The "wanting" of incentive salience differs from "liking" in the sense that liking is the pleasure that is immediately gained from the acquisition or consumption of a rewarding stimulus; the "wanting" of incentive salience serves a "motivational magnet" quality of a rewarding stimulus that makes it a desirable and attractive goal, transforming it from a mere sensory experience into something that commands attention, induces approach, and causes it to be sought out.

Incentive salience is regulated by a number of brain structures, but it is assigned to stimuli by a region of the ventral striatum known as the nucleus accumbens shell. Incentive salience is primarily regulated by dopamine neurotransmission in the mesocorticolimbic projection, but activity in other dopaminergic pathways and hedonic hotspots (e.g., the ventral pallidum) also modulate incentive salience.

Clinical significance

Addiction

The assignment of incentive salience to stimuli is dysregulated in addiction. Addictive drugs are intrinsically rewarding (not to be confused with pleasure) and therefore function as primary positive reinforcers of continued drug use that are assigned incentive salience. During the development of an addiction, the repeated association of otherwise neutral and even non-rewarding stimuli with drug consumption triggers an associative learning process that causes these previously neutral stimuli to act as conditioned positive reinforcers of addictive drug use (i.e., these stimuli start to function as drug cues). As conditioned positive reinforcers of drug use, these previously neutral stimuli are assigned incentive salience (which manifests as a craving) – sometimes at pathologically high levels due to reward sensitization – which can transfer to the primary reinforcer (e.g., the use of an addictive drug) with which it was originally paired. Thus, if an individual remains abstinent from drug use for some time and encounters one of these drug cues, a craving for the associated drug may reappear. For example, anti-drug agencies previously used posters with images of drug paraphernalia as an attempt to show the dangers of drug use. However, such posters are no longer used because of the effects of incentive salience in causing relapse upon sight of the stimuli illustrated in the posters.

In addiction, the "liking" (pleasure or hedonic value) of a drug or other stimulus becomes dissociated from "wanting" (i.e., desire or craving) due to the sensitization of incentive salience. In fact, if the incentive salience associated with drug-taking becomes pathologically amplified, the user may want the drug more and more while liking it less and less as tolerance develops to the drug's pleasurable effects.

Neuropsychopharmacology

Dopaminergic psychostimulants
Amphetamine improves task saliency (motivation to perform a task) and increases arousal (wakefulness), in turn promoting goal-directed behavior. The reinforcing and motivational salience-promoting effects of amphetamine are mostly due to enhanced dopaminergic activity in the mesolimbic pathway.

See also

Notes

References

Addiction
Amphetamine
Attention
Behaviorism
Behavior modification
Cognition
Cognitive psychology
Motivation
Neuropsychology